The 1989 Maui Invitational Tournament was an early-season college basketball tournament that was played, for the 6th time, from November 24 to November 26, 1989. The tournament, which began in 1984, was part of the 1989-90 NCAA Division I men's basketball season.  The tournament was played at the Lahaina Civic Center in Maui, Hawaiiand was won by the Missouri Tigers. It was the first title for the program and its head coach Norm Stewart.

Bracket

References

Maui Invitational Tournament
Maui Invitational